Brewmaster Matt Cole partnered with Glenn Benigni, owner of Fat Head's Saloon in Pittsburgh, Pennsylvania, to open Fat Head's Brewery & Saloon in Cleveland, Ohio in 2009, with Cole supplying beer to the Pittsburgh location. A production brewery opened in Middleburg Heights, Ohio in March 2012 and another brewpub location opened in Portland, Oregon in November 2014, which has since closed. Fat Head's is known for their signature beers Head Hunter IPA and Bumble Berry Honey Blueberry Ale.

Background 
Fat Head's Saloon opened in the historic South Side of Pittsburgh, Pennsylvania in 1992 and grew to be known for its selection of craft beer and large sandwiches, called "headwiches."

Brewer Matt Cole apprenticed at Baltimore Brewing Co., then worked at Penn Brewery and Great Lakes Brewing Company before joining Rocky River Brewing Company. Cole spent more than a decade there, winning several awards at both Great American Beer Festival and World Beer Cup.

Fat Head's Brewery & Saloon 
Fat Head's Brewery & Saloon opened in North Olmsted, Ohio, a suburb of Cleveland, on April 7, 2009. The brewpub has a 35-seat bar and a 200-seat dining room. There are 30 rotating tap handles that serve beers from Fat Head's as well as guest breweries. There is also a game room with a video games, a vintage bowling machine, pool tables, and dart boards. Derek Wilson, formerly of Great Lakes Brewing Company, heads the kitchen. In addition to the signature headwiches, a staple at the Pittsburgh Saloon, Wilson added stone oven pizzas, smoke house wings, and pulled pork to the menu.

Fat Head's Brewery opened in March, 2012 in a warehouse in Middleburg Heights, Ohio. The production brewery supplies beer for the Fat Head's restaurants in Pittsburgh and North Olmsted, as well as bottles and kegs for distributes. As of 2013, the brewery has a BrauKon brewhouse that was purchased from Tröegs Brewing Company. A tasting room and retail shop opened on October 18, 2013.

Fat Head's Portland 

Fat Head's opened in the Pearl District of Portland, Oregon on November 3, 2014.  In 2018, the location changed owners and became Von Ebert Brewing, a Portland-based company.  The brewpub had 278 seats throughout the bar and dining room and 42 rotating tap hands that served beers from Fat Head's as well as guest breweries.  The brewery featured a 10-barrel JVNW brewhouse with 13 fermentors and 12 bright tanks. Matt Cole was the brewmaster, with Eric Van Tassel who served as the head brewer. They served Fat Head's signature beers, including Bumble Berry Honey Blueberry Ale and Head Hunter IPA, as well as some of their own creations, including Zoobomb Dortmunder and Ultra Pils North German-Stlyle Pilsner.

Awards

See also 
 Beer and breweries by region
 Beer in the United States
 List of breweries in Ohio
 List of microbreweries
 List of breweries in the United States

References

External links 
 Fat Head's Saloon Pittsburgh
 Fat Head's Brewery & Saloon Cleveland
 Fat Head's Brewery 
 Fat Head's Brewery & Saloon Portland

American beer brands
Beer brewing companies based in Ohio
Food and drink companies established in 2009
2009 establishments in Ohio
Defunct restaurants in Portland, Oregon
Pearl District, Portland, Oregon